Sir William Robson Brown (1 September 1900 – 25 February 1975) was a British Conservative politician.  He was elected in 1950 as the first Member of Parliament for the new Surrey constituency of Esher.  Robson-Brown served until his retirement in 1970, preceding Carol Mather.

References 
http://www.psr.keele.ac.uk

External links 
 

1900 births
1975 deaths
Conservative Party (UK) MPs for English constituencies
UK MPs 1950–1951
UK MPs 1951–1955
UK MPs 1955–1959
UK MPs 1959–1964
UK MPs 1964–1966
UK MPs 1966–1970
Place of birth missing
Place of death missing
Knights Bachelor
Royal Flying Corps officers
British Army personnel of World War I
Royal Air Force personnel of World War I
Royal Air Force officers